Jessica Fernandez may refer to:

 Jessica Fernández (born 1979), Mexican professional tennis player
 Jessica Fernandez, finalist in So You Think You Can Dance (U.S. season 2)